Wu Wen-chia (born 24 October 1963) is a Taiwanese former international table tennis player.

Wu, who was the U.S. Open champion in 1984, represented Chinese Taipei at two Olympic Games and won three Asian Games bronze medals for his country.

At the 1988 Summer Olympics in Seoul, he won three singles matches to finish fourth from eight competitors in his group. In the doubles, he and partner Huang Huei-chieh were third in their group, one place outside of qualifying for the knockout stage.

He also competed at the 1996 Summer Olympics in Atlanta, where he featured only in the doubles event, partnering Chiang Peng-lung.

External links

References

1963 births
Living people
Taiwanese male table tennis players
Olympic table tennis players of Taiwan
Table tennis players at the 1988 Summer Olympics
Table tennis players at the 1996 Summer Olympics
Asian Games medalists in table tennis
Asian Games bronze medalists for Chinese Taipei
Medalists at the 1994 Asian Games
Medalists at the 1998 Asian Games
Table tennis players at the 1994 Asian Games
Table tennis players at the 1998 Asian Games
20th-century Taiwanese people